Giovanni Antonio Laveglia/LaVeglia (1653 – after 1710) was an Italian painter of the seventeenth and eighteenth centuries, active in the Piedmont.

Biography
He was born in Carmagnola to father painter, Pietro Laveglia, (1625-1675) who had emigrated to Asti from Paris. A canvas at the Civic Gallery of the Palazzo Mazzetti, depicting Christ and the Apostles on the shores of the Borbore (circa 1671) includes a distant view of the town of Asti.

In Bartoli's Notizia about artworks, he takes notice of a Laveglia d'Asti, who was a painter of quadratura in the church of San Martino of Astia.

In 1677, Giovanni Antonio married Lucrezia Maria Fariano in Asti. In 1708, Giovanni Carlo Aliberti married Giovanni Antonio's daughter.

References

1653 births
1710 deaths
People from the Province of Asti
17th-century Italian painters
Italian male painters
18th-century Italian painters
Painters from Piedmont
Italian Baroque painters
18th-century Italian male artists